Caesar P. Bacarella (born December 18, 1975) is an American professional stock car racing driver. He competes part-time in the NASCAR Xfinity Series, driving the No. 45 Chevrolet Camaro for Alpha Prime Racing. Bacarella has also driven in the ARCA Racing Series and Pirelli World Challenge.

Racing career

Pirelli World Challenge
For the 2018 season, Bacarella joined Squadra Corse Garage Italia Americas for the series' Sprint-X races.

ARCA Racing Series
Bacarella drove in two races in the 2017 ARCA Racing Series with Finney Racing, driving the No. 80 car. Bacarella finished 33rd after being involved in a wreck in his first start, at Daytona. His second start, also with Finney Racing and his No. 80 car, came at Talladega. There, he yielded a DNF once again but finished 25th.

NASCAR Xfinity Series
Teaming up with B. J. McLeod Motorsports, Bacarella made his debut in the 2017 Ticket Galaxy 200 at Phoenix. After qualifying on owner points in 37th, he cut down on Playoff contender Brennan Poole early in the race as a lapped car, eliminating Poole from the race and ending his championship hopes. Poole later sounded off on the dangers of lapped cars, as did Monster Energy NASCAR Cup Series driver Austin Dillon, who was running the race. Referring to Bacarella's overall driving, Dillon said over in-car communications "get that guy off the freaking track, man! Where did he get a licence to do this?" Poole, for his part, commented on what he saw as the need for NASCAR to look at how it approves drivers for competition. Bacarella finished 30th in the race, and ran the following week at Homestead, finishing 31st.

During the off-season, Bacarella was tapped to drive the No. 8 car once again at the season opener at Daytona in 2018.

On August 30, 2021, it was announced that Bacarella and Tommy Joe Martins will form Alpha Prime Racing, and will compete full-time in the Xfinity Series in 2022. Bacarella, Martins, and Rajah Caruth are expected to run the full season under part-time schedules. On November 22, NASCAR indefinitely suspended Bacarella for substance abuse after he claimed he unknowingly took a workout supplement that is on the banned substances list. Bacarella has since enrolled in the Road to Recovery program and is expected to return for the Daytona race. On February 14, 2022, Bacarella was reinstated by NASCAR.

Motorsports career results

NASCAR
(key) (Bold – Pole position awarded by qualifying time. Italics – Pole position earned by points standings or practice time. * – Most laps led.)

Xfinity Series

ARCA Racing Series
(key) (Bold – Pole position awarded by qualifying time. Italics – Pole position earned by points standings or practice time. * – Most laps led.)

 Season still in progress
 Ineligible for series points

References

External links
 
 

Living people
NASCAR drivers
ARCA Menards Series drivers
1975 births
Racing drivers from Florida
Racing drivers from Miami
People from Parkland, Florida
GT World Challenge America drivers
Sportspeople from Broward County, Florida